Mutiny on the Enterprise is a science fiction novel by American writer Robert E. Vardeman, part of the Star Trek: The Original Series franchise.

Plot
A much needed peace mission to the Orion Arm is delayed when the Enterprise becomes damaged while in orbit around a living planet. Further problems arise when a mysterious female guest causes much of the crew to become hardline pacifists - ruining the real mission. Kirk must now lead the rebellion against his own crew.

References

External links

Novels based on Star Trek: The Original Series
1983 American novels
American science fiction novels